Harry Dewhurst was Conservative MP for Northwich.

He won the seat from the Liberals in 1918, but stood down in 1922.

Sources
British Parliamentary Election Results 1918-1949, F W S Craig
Whitaker's Almanack, 1919 to 1922 editions

Conservative Party (UK) MPs for English constituencies
Politics of Cheshire